The Board of Regents, State of Iowa (commonly referred to as the Iowa Board of Regents) is the 9-member governing body overseeing the three public universities in the state of Iowa: the University of Iowa, Iowa State University, and the University of Northern Iowa. The board also serves the Iowa School for the Deaf and the Iowa Braille and Sight Saving School, the state's two public special schools.

Composition

The governor of Iowa appoints regents to six-year terms, which are subject to Iowa Senate confirmation by a two-thirds vote. Terms begin May 1 and end April 30.

The board has nine members. Under state law, one of the regents must be a student of one of the three public universities, and no more than five members can be of the same political affiliation or gender.

The current members of the Board of Regents are as follows:

References

External links
Board of Regents, State of Iowa

University of Iowa
Iowa State University
University of Northern Iowa
Public education in Iowa
Governing bodies of universities and colleges in the United States